Hypericum foliosum is a species of flowering plant in the St. John's wort family Hypericaceae, section Androsaemum. It is endemic to the Azores.

Distribution and habitat 

Description 
Its inflorescence is golden yellow and has 12-18 petals. It has 20-30 stamens grouped into several stamen fascicles.

References 

foliosum
Endemic flora of the Azores